Josephine Richards West (May 25, 1853 – April 23, 1933) was a leader in the Church of Jesus Christ of Latter-day Saints (LDS Church) and was a suffragist from Utah Territory.

Josephine Richards was born in Salt Lake City, Utah Territory, to Franklin D. Richards and Jane Snyder. In 1873 she married Joseph A. West; they resided in Ogden, Utah.

Richards was a member of the general board of the Primary Association of the LDS Church from 1893 until her death. In 1896, she succeeded Clara C. M. Cannon as second counselor to Louie B. Felt in the general presidency of the Primary. West served in this capacity until 1905, when she was succeeded by Clara W. Beebe.

West was a suffragist and twice served as a delegate from Utah Territory to women's suffrage conferences in Washington, D.C.

West was the mother of Franklin L. West, a leader and educator in the LDS Church.

West died of pneumonia at Logan, Utah and is buried in the Ogden City Cemetery.

References
Andrew Jenson. Latter-day Saints Biographical Encyclopedia 4:303.

External links

State of Utah Death Certificate

1853 births
1933 deaths
American leaders of the Church of Jesus Christ of Latter-day Saints
American suffragists
Counselors in the General Presidency of the Primary (LDS Church)
Deaths from pneumonia in Utah
Latter Day Saints from Utah
Mormon feminists
People from Ogden, Utah
Primary (LDS Church) people
Richards–Young family